Cleome gynandra is a species of Cleome that is used as a green vegetable. It is known by many common names including Shona cabbage, African cabbage, spiderwisp, cat's whiskers,   and stinkweed. It is an annual wildflower native to Africa but has become widespread in many tropical and sub-tropical parts of the world. It is an erect, branching plant generally between 25 cm and 60 cm tall. Its sparse leaves are each made up of 3–5 oval-shaped leaflets. The flowers are white, sometimes changing to rose pink as they age. The seed is a brown 1.5 mm diameter sphere. The leaves and flowers are both edible. The leaves have a strong bitter, sometimes peppery flavor similar to mustard greens.

Uses

Typically, the leaves and shoots are eaten boiled or in stews. The leaves are often eaten in Sub-Saharan Africa, where they are often dried for storage, then cooked with milk or butter to reduce its bitter taste. In Uganda and Tanzania, the leaves are cooked with groundnut paste.

The plant is useful for intercropping due to its insect repellent properties.

In Thailand and Malaysia, the leaves are a popular food item fermented with rice water as a pickle known as phak sian dong. The same pickle is also eaten in the northern states of Malaysia, and is known as jeruk maman. The state of Negeri Sembilan specializes in rendang maman, where the leaves are braised in spiced coconut milk for a long period of time to achieve the desirable crisp and texture.

Cleome gynandra is high in beta-carotene, folic acid, ascorbic acid and calcium. It also contains vitamin E, iron, and oxalic acid. Generally, the leaves are about 4.0% protein. The leaves also have antioxidative properties that can help with inflammatory diseases. Because of its anti-inflammatory properties, it is sometimes used as a medicinal herb.

Ecology
It is an annual wildflower native to Africa but has naturalized across tropic and sub-tropical regions across Asia. It grows well in disturbed, well-drained soils, but is also drought-tolerant. It does not tolerate cold temperatures well, and is frost-tender.

Cleome gynandra is considered an invasive weed in many places in the U.S. and elsewhere in the Pacific.

Biochemistry
Cleome gynandra uses NAD-malic enzyme type  photosynthesis and has the characteristic traits associated with this, including changes in leaf biochemistry, cell biology and development. The family Cleomaceae is relatively close to Brassicaceae with Arabidopsis thaliana (a  photosynthetic plant) and therefore offers comparison with this well studied model organism. The  pathway in this species evolved independently from two other  Cleome species, C. angustifolia and C. oxalidea.

See also
List of leaf vegetables
List of Thai ingredients

References

External links

JIRCAS : Cleome gynandra : Local Vegetables of Thailand 

gynandra
Rosids of Australia
Plants described in 1753
Taxa named by Carl Linnaeus
Flora of Ashmore and Cartier Islands
Leaf vegetables
Asian vegetables